John Michael Diettrich (born May 9, 1963) is a former American football kicker who played for the Houston Oilers of the National Football League (NFL). He played college football at Ball State University.

References 

Living people
1963 births
American football placekickers
Ball State Cardinals football players
Houston Oilers players